Sailing competitions at the 2019 Pan American Games in Lima, Peru took place between August 3 and 10, 2019 at the Yacht Club Peruano in the city of Paracas.

Ten medal events were contested. Two of the events were for men, three for women, two were open (any gender can compete) and three are mixed (entries are required to include both genders). Eight of the events were carried over from the 2015 Games, with the Nacra 17 and Kites events replacing the Hobie 16 and J/24. A total of 148 athletes across 106 boats qualified to compete at the games. On January 17, 2019, it was announced that an 11th medal event would be contested, the 49er, for men. A total of 168 sailors and 116 boats were scheduled to compete.

The top placing athlete (not already qualified) from North America and South America in the men's laser and women's laser radial, qualified for the sailing competitions at the 2020 Summer Olympics in Tokyo, Japan, along with the top two boats in the 49er, 49erfx and Nacra 17 events will also qualify.

Medal table

Medalists

Men's events

Women's events

Open events

Mixed events

Participating nations
A total of 26 countries qualified sailors, a record high. The number of athletes a nation entered is in parentheses beside the name of the country.

Qualification

A total of 168 sailors and 116 boats qualified to compete at the games. A nation may enter a maximum of one boat in each of the ten events and a maximum of 17 athletes. Each event had different qualifying events that began in 2017. The host nation (Peru) automatically qualified in all ten events (17 athletes).

See also
Sailing at the 2020 Summer Olympics

References

External links
Results book

 
Events at the 2019 Pan American Games
Pan American Games
2019